Oregon is a state located in the Western United States that is divided into 36 counties and contains 135 census designated-places (CDPs). All population data is based on the 2010 census.



Census-Designated Places

See also 

List of counties in Oregon
List of cities and unincorporated communities in Oregon

References 

Oregon